Dowman is the surname of

 Keith Dowman (born 1945), English Dzogchen teacher and translator of Tibetan Buddhist texts
 Mathew Dowman (born 1974), English cricketer
 Ruth Dowman (born 1930), New Zealand long jumper
 Steve Dowman (born 1958), English footballer
 Paul Darby-Dowman (born 1977), British sprint canoer

See also

 John Dolman (or Dowman; died 1526), English clergyman and benefactor

 jibarie Dowman
Is a firefighter that works in the Clarendon he's was on born on September 11 1996 he's 24 years of age he currently residue in kellits Clarendon